Ushikubi Dam is a dam in the Fukuoka Prefecture of Japan.

Dams in Fukuoka Prefecture
Dams completed in 1991
1991 establishments in Japan